The following highways are numbered 511:

Canada
 Alberta Highway 511
 Ontario Highway 511 (former)

United States
  U.S. Route 511 (former)
  Florida State Road 511 (former)
  County Road 511 (Brevard County, Florida)
  Nevada State Route 511 (former)
  County Route 511 (New Jersey)
  Ohio State Route 511
  Farm to Market Road 511
Territories
  Puerto Rico Highway 511